= Roleplayer (role-playing game) =

1983 universal system RPG

Roleplayer is a role-playing game published by Roleplayer Enterprises in 1983.

== Description ==
Roleplayer is a universal role-playing system, and includes rules for using the game with medieval fantasy, mutant powers, modern horror, and future technology.

== Publication history ==
Roleplayer was designed by Matthew P. King, and published by Roleplayer Enterprises in 1983. It is a 187-page 3 hole-punched looseleaf book.
